The Basic Leucine Zipper Domain (bZIP domain) is found in many DNA binding eukaryotic proteins. One part of the domain contains a region that mediates sequence specific DNA binding properties and the leucine zipper that is required to hold together (dimerize) two DNA binding regions. The DNA binding region comprises a number of basic amino acids such as arginine and lysine. Proteins containing this domain are transcription factors.

bZIP transcription factors

bZIP transcription factors are found in all eukaryotes and form one of the largest families of dimerizing TFs.  An evolutionary study from 2008 revealed that 4 bZIP genes were encoded by the genome of the most recent common ancestor of all plants. Interactions between bZIP transcription factors are numerous and complex  and play important roles in cancer development in epithelial tissues, steroid hormone synthesis by cells of endocrine tissues, factors affecting reproductive functions, and several other phenomena that affect human health.

bZIP domain containing proteins

 AP-1 fos/jun heterodimer that forms a transcription factor
 Jun-B transcription factor
 CREB cAMP response element transcription factor
 OPAQUE2 (O2) transcription factor of the 22-kD zein gene that encodes a class of storage proteins in the endosperm of maize  (Zea Mays) kernels
 NFE2L2 or Nrf2
 Bzip Maf transcription factors

Human proteins containing this domain 
ATF1;      ATF2;      ATF4;      ATF5;      ATF6;      ATF7;      BACH1;     BACH2;
BATF;      BATF2;     CEBPA;     CEBPB;     CEBPD;     CEBPE;     CEBPG;     CEBPZ;     CREB1;     CREB3;     CREB3L1;   CREB3L2;   CREB3L3;   CREB3L4;
CREB5;     CREBL1;    CREM;      E4BP4;     FOSL1;     FOSL2;     JUN;       JUNB;      JUND;      MAFA;      MAFB;    MAFF;   MAFG;    NRL;   C-MAF;    MAFK;    
NFE2;      NFE2L2;    NFE2L3;    SNFT;   XBP1

References

External links
bZIP domain entry in the SMART database
bZIP family at PlantTFDB: Plant Transcription Factor Database
Plant bZIP transcription factors 

Protein domains
DNA-binding proteins